KNUV (1190 kHz) is a commercial AM radio station licensed to Tolleson, Arizona, and serving the Phoenix metropolitan area.  It is owned by Denver-based Amigo Multimedia, Inc.  The station has a Spanish-language radio format using brokered programming where hosts pay for their time on the station.  Most programs are talk-based, with some music shows.

By day, KNUV broadcasts at 5,000 watts.  But 1190 AM is a clear channel frequency.  So KNUV must reduce power at night to 250 watts to avoid interfering with other stations.  It uses a directional antenna with a three-tower array at all times.  The transmitter is on South 95th Avenue at West Jefferson Street in Tolleson.  Programming is also heard on 250 watt FM translator K298CK at 107.5 MHz in Phoenix.

History
It was originally owned by E. O. Smith and used the call sign KZON. It switched to a Regional Mexican format, becoming KRDS in 1963. The station operated as "Cards Country" with a country music format prior to adopting a talk radio format in the early 1970s. It changed to a Christian Radio format in 1975, featuring religious talk and music.

It was simulcast on KRDS-FM 105.3 Wickenburg in the 1990s. That station is now KHOV-FM.

In 1997, the station changed call letters to KMYL.  KMYL aired the "Music of Your Life" adult standards format, and later changed to "NBC 1190", as a variety talk station (later an infomercial and brokered talk station) which ran NBC Radio News at the top of the hour.

La Buena Onda

The format was changed in August 2005 when the station was acquired by a startup group, New Radio Venture, which brought a Spanish-language news/talk format targeting the large Spanish-speaking immigrant population in the Phoenix area. At the same time, NRV bought a Denver station, which it christened KNRV, and gave it an identical format. The newly renamed KNUV became known as "La Buena Onda" (The Good Wave). At the peak of the first Buena Onda era, KNUV had Lily Antonini Latina reporter with breaking news every half an hour and with live reports and interviews. The station also was the English-language radio home of the Phoenix Mercury of the WNBA.

On November 9, 2007, KNUV protested the police description of the "Chandler Rapist" as a "Hispanic," claiming it amounts to racial profiling. The man, believed to be responsible for six attacks on teenage girls starting in June 2006 was described as Hispanic, 28 to 40 years old, 5 feet 6 inches tall, muscular, with a mustache and black hair. Radio station 1190AM was the first hispánic news media to promote and follow up the story.

KNUV and KNRV signed off on July 31, 2008. The station was shut down due to "a faltering economy, ongoing crackdowns on undocumented immigrants and a tough market for Spanish talk radio".

Progressive talk format

After being silent for two months, KNUV began simulcasting crosstown station KPHX on October 9, 2008. KPHX's progressive talk radio programming, consisting of programming from Nova M Radio and Air America Radio, was moved to KNUV in January 2009 as Nova M's licensing agreement with KPHX came to an end.  KNUV assumed the flagship station designation for Nova M, which later became On Second Thought before ceasing operations entirely by the spring of 2009. KPHX adopted The Lounge Sound music radio format at that time, which itself lasted only until July 2009, when KPHX returned to the progressive talk format, with significant involvement from Dr. Mike Newcomb, a key player in that format on each of the stations on which it has been broadcast in the Phoenix market dating back to 2004.

Spanish radio returns
According to the Phoenix New Times paper KNUV's doors were padlocked shut on March 2, 2009. On the morning of March 5, 2009, KNUV stopped broadcasting progressive talk and switched back to a Spanish-language format later that afternoon.

In April 2009, the station went off the air due to station owner New Radio Venture's bankruptcy.

On July 13, 2009, the station returned to the air again, airing paid programming in Spanish and news programming from Mexico at other times.

KNUV currently airs a limited selection of local programming during the daytime and Radio Fórmula programs from Mexico at night.

Translators

References

External links
 http://www.onda1190am.com/

Radio stations established in 1961
Talk radio stations in the United States
NUV
NUV
Hispanic and Latino American culture in Phoenix, Arizona